Đập Đá is a ward (phường) in south central Vietnam. It is located in An Nhon Town in Bình Định Province.

Geography and Infrastructure
Đập Đá is located in Binh Dinh’s main lowland plain in the south of the province. Đập Đá River, part of the Côn River delta, flows through the town. 

Đập Đá is located along National Road 1, Vietnam’s most important road. It is also not far from National Road 19 (7 km to the south), which connects to the ports of Quy Nhon (23 km to the south-east), and the Central Highlands in the west.

Phu Cat Airport is within 10 km to the north of the town.

History and Heritage Sites
Đập Đá shares a location with the former city-state of Vijaya of Champa. The ruins of the citadel are just around 3 km from the town centre. Vijaya was the capital of Champa until its defeat by the Vietnamese in 1471.

References

Populated places in Bình Định province